

Serhii Korovayny is a Ukrainian photo-journalist notable for there work covering the Russo-Ukrainian war. They are a regular contributor to the Wall Street Journal, and there work has been featured in numerous publications and organizations, such as Time Magazine, National Geographic, and the United Nations.

In 2022 Korovayny was awarded the James Foley Award for Conflict Reporting.

Before the war Korovayny worked primarily on environmental documentary journalism in Ukraine.

Korovayny was a Fulbright scholar and earned a Master of Arts in Photography from Syracuse University.

See also
 Stanislav Aseyev
 Anastasia Vlasova (journalist)

References

Notes

Citations

External links
 Official website

Ukrainian journalists
Pro-Ukrainian people of the war in Donbas
Ukrainian photographers
Living people
Syracuse University alumni
Fulbright alumni
1995 births